Manavgat is a city in the district of the Antalya Province in Turkey,  from the city of Antalya. The Manavgat River has a waterfall near the city. The population of the district is 242,490 (2020 census).

Geography

Between the Taurus Mountains to the north, and the sandy beaches of the Mediterranean coast, much of the district is surrounded by a flat plain. This is mostly fertile farmland and agriculture is well-developed in Manavgat, keeping livestock and growing crops including grains, sesame and many fruits and vegetables; in recent years olives have also been planted. There is no industry except for food-processing, so apart from agriculture the local economy depends on tourism. 

The mountains are covered with forests and typical Mediterranean shrubs, there are small plains higher in the mountains too, traditionally used for summer grazing by the yörük nomads. Manavgat has a Mediterranean climate of hot, dry summers and warm, wet winters; the temperature rarely drops to freezing. The district is irrigated by the Manavgat River, and has two dams for hydro-electric power. In 2001 plans began to export water from these reservoirs to Israel and other Mediterranean countries including Malta and Cyprus; as of 2006 these plans are on hold.

History

The ancient cities of Side and Selge date back to the 6th century BC. Manavgat was taken over by the Seljuk Turks in 1220 and the Ottoman Empire in 1472.The town also has a castle named "Zindan Kalesi"literally Dungeon Castle in English.

Tourism

With  of hot, sunny coastline, much of it sandy beaches, with a long river and the waterfall, well-protected countryside including mountains and forests, Manavgat has an important tourist industry. There is plenty of accommodation on the coastline and many places to explore including historical sites, rivers, streams and caves. And there is the sea itself including the odd experience of swimming from fresh water into the salt sea at the rivermouth. Predictably the cuisine includes fish from the Mediterranean. 

The villages of Kumköy and Ilıca on the coast are particularly lively.

Places of interest
 Köprülü Canyon - in the middle of a forested national park; the canyon is popular for river-rafting.
 The antique cities of:
 Side, with its theatre and port.
Seleucia (Pamphylia) - visited by Alexander the Great
Selge
Manavgat Waterfall, and another smaller waterfall on the river.
Oymapinar Dam
Tilkiler Cave

Villages

External links 

 Manavgat - Manavgat Excellent Photos
 Some 50 pictures of the town
 Side-Manavgat - Side and Manavgat
 Titreyengol.com - Titreyengöl in Manavgat

References

Turkish Riviera
Populated places in Antalya Province
Districts of Antalya Province
Manavgat District